The Empire Collegiate Hockey Conference (ECHC) is a collegiate hockey conference that plays in Division III of the Collegiate Hockey Federation (CHF). Established in May 2009, The University of Albany, Farmingdale State College, Hofstra University, Union College, Skidmore College, Southern Connecticut State, Siena College and Fairfield University set out to establish an organization.

In the fall of 2019, the Empire Collegiate Hockey Conference welcomed Ramapo College, Hofstra University, Fordham University, and Stony Brook University to its family, solidifying the conference as the premier conference in the Collegiate Hockey Federation. The conference is made up of teams on the Atlantic coast, specifically colleges and universities in Connecticut, New York, and New Jersey.

Members

Former members

Champions

2020- Fairfield
2019- Farmingdale State
2018- Farmingdale State
2017- Farmingdale State
2016- Farmingdale State
2015- Farmingdale State
2014- Fairfield
2013- Farmingdale State
2012- Southern Connecticut State
2011- Southern Connecticut State
2010- Farmingdale State

See also
American Collegiate Hockey Association
List of ice hockey leagues

References

 Empire College Hockey Conference

ACHA Division 3 conferences